is located in near Chiplun in Ratnagiri district in Maharashtra, India. It lies on National Highway NH 17.
The village is neighbor to villages like sawarde and aravali.
Villages in Ratnagiri district